"Honey-Babe" is a song written by Max Steiner and Paul Francis Webster which was featured in the 1955 film Battle Cry. It was commercially recorded by Art Mooney and His Orchestra, reaching No. 6 on the U.S. pop chart in 1955.

The song ranked at No. 23 on Billboard magazine's Top 30 singles of 1955.

Since its release, the song has been used as a cadence, with countless variations and adaptations in verses, in all branches of the US military to the present day.

Other versions
The Sauter-Finegan Orchestra released the original version of the song as a single in February 1955, but it did not chart.
Cyril Stapleton and His Orchestra featuring Gordon Langhorn released a version of the song as the B-side to his 1955 hit single "Blue Star".
Lightnin' Hopkins' version of the song was released on his 1991 compilation album The Complete Aladdin Recordings.

References

1954 songs
1954 singles
Songs with lyrics by Paul Francis Webster
MGM Records singles
RCA Victor singles